Opinion polling for the 2019 Israeli legislative election may refer to:

 Opinion polling for the April 2019 Israeli legislative election
 Opinion polling for the September 2019 Israeli legislative election